The Stafford Gallery was an early 20th-century art gallery in London. Artists whose works were exhibited there include both internationally known painters such as Pablo Picasso, Paul Gauguin, Paul Cézanne and Gustave Courbet and significant English figures such as Walter Sickert and Sir William Nicholson.

The gallery opened in the early years of the century at 34 Old Bond Street, London W., on the corner with Stafford Street; but by 1910 had moved to 1 Duke Street, St. James's.

Exhibitions
In June 1903 the gallery showed watercolours by William Nicholson of the colleges of Oxford University. Twenty-four lithographs of these, with descriptive text by Arthur Waugh, were published by the gallery in two folios in 1905. Nicholson also provided the cover illustration for the catalogue an exhibition of old masters in 1910.

In the second decade of the century, and thus shortly after Roger Fry's Manet and the Post-Impressionists at the Grafton Galleries in 1910–11, the Stafford Gallery began to show more avant-garde, particularly French, works. In 1911 there were exhibitions of paintings by Courbet (March), Sickert (June), Gauguin and Cézanne (November), and possibly Camille Pissarro in October; work by Vincent van Gogh may also have been shown. The Gauguin show is the subject of Spencer Gore's painting Gauguins and Connoisseurs at the Stafford Gallery. In 1912 there were exhibitions of paintings by the Scottish Colourist J.D. Fergusson (March) and drawings by Picasso (April).

References

Defunct art galleries in London